Bastilla acuta is a moth of the family Noctuidae. It is found in the Himalaya, Taiwan, Peninsular Malaysia, Sumatra and Borneo.

Subspecies
Bastilla acuta acuta
Bastilla acuta korintjiensis (Peninsular Malaysia, Sumatra, Borneo)

References

External links
Species info

Bastilla (moth)
Moths described in 1883